Ezgjan Alioski (born 12 February 1992) is a Macedonian professional footballer who plays as a winger or wing-back for Turkish Süper Lig club Fenerbahçe, on loan from Saudi club Al-Ahli, and for the North Macedonia national team. He is commonly known as 'Gjanni'.

A versatile left-footed player, he predominantly plays on the left wing, and can also play as striker, attacking midfielder, right wing, left wing-back or as a left-back.

Club career

Early career
Having joined their youth academy in 2003, Alioski began his career as a left-back in the second team of Young Boys from 2010 to 2013, where he scored four goals in 57 matches. In January 2013, he went to Schaffhausen on loan, before joining on a permanent transfer in October 2013, scoring four goals in 77 matches.

Lugano
He joined Lugano on loan in January 2016, and made his debut on 13 February in a 2–1 loss against Thun. Despite signing him as a left back, then Lugano manager Zdeněk Zeman converted Alioski into an attacking right winger and striker towards the end of the 2015–16 season. He scored his first goal for the club on 11 May 2016 in a 4–0 win to Zürich.

In June 2016, his move was made permanent. New manager Andrea Manzo continued to play Alioski in the attacking roles once the season started. He scored his first goal of the campaign in his second game on 30 July 2016, in a 2–1 win over Young Boys. He scored seven goals in his first ten games at the club. On 19 April 2017, Alioski scored a hat-trick for Lugano in a 4–2 victory against Sion.

He continued to impress during his first season and helped guide Lugano to a third-place finish in the Swiss Super League. He scored 16 goals in 34 games for Lugano and was the third top goalscorer in the league in the 2016–17 season, behind Seydou Doumbia (20) and Guillaume Hoarau (18). He was also the third highest in the division in terms of his assists, after making 14 in his 34 games, behind Yoric Ravet (17) and Matteo Tosetti (15).

Leeds United
Alioski was a part of Leeds United's return to the Premier League in 2019–20 after a sixteen-year wait, notwithstanding three seasons played in the second tier of English football. He scored important goals in the 2019–20 season.

2017–18 season
Alioski joined English club Leeds United on 13 July 2017. On 6 August 2017, he made his debut in a 3–2 victory against Bolton Wanderers and created the assist for teammate Chris Wood's goal. After gaining another assist, he received the man of the match award over Sunderland in a 2–0 win on 19 August. On 26 August, Alioski received the man of the match award and scored his first goal for Leeds in a 2–0 victory against Nottingham Forest. On 15 September, Alioski won the Championship Goal of the Month Award for August for his goal against Nottingham Forest. In November 2017, Alioski scored in all of Leeds United's four games, and was awarded with the club's award for Player of the Month.

On 16 April 2018, Alioski was nominated as one of four players for Leeds United's Player of The Year award. On 21 April, Alioski scored the winner with his seventh goal of the season in a 2–1 victory for Leeds in the Yorkshire derby against Barnsley. He ended the season with seven goals and five assists.

On 5 May, Alioski won the Goal of the Season award for his strike over Nottingham Forest at Leeds' annual award ceremony.

2018–19 season
He scored his first goal of the 2018–19 season with a goal on 11 August in a 4–1 victory of Derby County.

Alioski started the season for Leeds as a winger playing on the right or left side, but after an injury to regular left-back Barry Douglas in 2019, Alioski was praised for his form playing at left-back, with his form keeping a returning Douglas out of the side. He continued to thrive in this wing-back position throughout 2019, producing marauding runs up the left flank and scoring against Stoke City, Bolton Wanderers and West Bromwich Albion to bring his Championship tally for 2018–19 to seven, until, on 22 April, in Leeds' 2–0 defeat at Brentford, Alioski was substituted after twelve minutes with a torn meniscus and missed the remainder of the season, including play-offs.

During the 2018–19 season, Alioski played 47 games in all competitions, netting seven goals, after Leeds finished the regular season in third place after dropping out of the automatic promotion places with three games left following a loss to Wigan Athletic on 19 April. Leeds United qualified for the play-offs versus sixth-placed Derby County, with Alioski's season already ended by injury. Leeds won the first leg of the play-offs in a 1–0 win at Pride Park to bring into a 1–0 aggregate lead into the home leg at Elland Road. However, they lost the second leg 2–4, with Gaetano Berardi being sent off. This setback resulted in Leeds losing 4–3 on aggregate.

2019–20 season
On 24 August, Alioski scored his first goal of the 2019–20 season in a 3–0 win over Stoke City. After the English professional football season was paused in March 2020 due to the COVID-19 pandemic, the season was resumed during June, where Alioski earned promotion with Leeds to the Premier League and also become the EFL Championship winners for the 2019–20 season in July following a successful resumption of the season. Alioski played an important part in the promotion, scoring important goals and changing games.

2020–21 season
Alioski played his first Premier League game on 19 September 2020, when he came on as a 70th-minute substitute for Patrick Bamford in the team's 4–3 home win over Fulham. Three days earlier, Alioski had been in the starting line-up, scoring the only goal — in added time — in Leeds's 1–1 League Cup second round tie with Hull City (Hull went on to win 9–8 on penalties with Alioski missing his spot kick). He made his first Premier League start on 5 October 2020 against Manchester City, coming into the first eleven in place of Jack Harrison, who was ineligible to play against his parent club. On 16 December 2020, he scored his first Premier League goal in the 5–2 home win against Newcastle United. Alioski scored his final goal of 2020 in a 5–0 away win over West Bromwich Albion. Alioski was offered a new contract at the end of the season, but was unable to reach an agreement with the club, thus departing the club after four years.

Al-Ahli
On 29 July 2021, Alioski signed for Saudi Arabian club Al-Ahli.

Fenerbahçe
On 2 August 2022, he signed a one-year loan contract with Fenerbahçe.

International career
Eligible to represent Macedonia and Albania due to his Albanian heritage, Alioski decided to represent the country of his birth, Macedonia. After representing Macedonia at various youth levels, he made his debut for the senior side in 2013.

He scored his first international goal against Albania on 5 September 2016 in a 2018 FIFA World Cup qualification match. He mainly played for his national side in a left wing-back position, before being converted to a more attacking midfield position.

On 6 September 2018, Alioski scored in a 2–0 win over Gibraltar in the UEFA Nations League. He scored in his country's next game on 9 September in a 2–0 UEFA Nations League win against Armenia.

In May 2021, Alioski was selected in the final 26-man squad to represent North Macedonia at the postponed UEFA Euro 2020, marking the country's first appearance at a major tournament. During North Macedonia's opening fixture of the tournament against Austria, immediatedly after striker Marko Arnautović (who is half-Serbian) scored, Arnautović angrily shouted towards Alioski and teammate Egzon Bejtulai–both of Albanian descent–what were believed to be anti-Albanian slurs. Football Federation of Macedonia released a statement calling for action by UEFA.

Personal life
Alioski is Muslim. He is a multilingual person who can speak Albanian, English, French, German, Italian, Macedonian and Spanish fluently. He has citizenships of North Macedonia and Switzerland.

Career statistics

Club

International

As of match played 14 November 2021. North Macedonia score listed first, score column indicates score after each Alioski goal.

Honours
Leeds United
EFL Championship: 2019–20

Individual
Swiss Super League Team of the Year: 2016–17
EFL Championship Goal of the Month: August 2017
Leeds United Goal of the Season: 2017–18

References

External links

Ezgjan Alioski at Macedonianfootball.com
Ezgjan Alioski at ESPN FC

1992 births
Living people
Sportspeople from Prilep
Macedonian footballers
Association football fullbacks
BSC Young Boys players
FC Schaffhausen players
FC Lugano players
Leeds United F.C. players
Al-Ahli Saudi FC players
Fenerbahçe S.K. footballers
Swiss Challenge League players
English Football League players
Premier League players
Saudi Professional League players
Süper Lig players
North Macedonia youth international footballers
North Macedonia under-21 international footballers
North Macedonia international footballers
UEFA Euro 2020 players
Macedonian expatriate footballers
Expatriate footballers in Switzerland
Expatriate footballers in England
Expatriate footballers in Saudi Arabia
Expatriate footballers in Turkey
Macedonian expatriate sportspeople in Switzerland
Macedonian expatriate sportspeople in England
Macedonian expatriate sportspeople in Saudi Arabia
Macedonian expatriate sportspeople in Turkey
Albanian footballers from North Macedonia